Hines is an unincorporated community located in the town of Hawthorne, Douglas County, Wisconsin, United States.

History
Hines contained a post office from 1903 until 1955. The community was named for Edward Hines, a businessperson in the logging industry.

Notes

Unincorporated communities in Douglas County, Wisconsin
Unincorporated communities in Wisconsin